The Tin Drum is a 1979 film adaptation of Günter Grass' novel of the same title, directed by Volker Schlöndorff from a screenplay co-written with Jean-Claude Carrière and Franz Seitz. It stars Mario Adorf, Angela Winkler, Daniel Olbrychski, Katharina Thalbach, Charles Aznavour, and David Bennent in the lead role of Oskar Matzerath, a young boy who willfully arrests his own physical development and remains in the body of a child even as he enters adulthood.

A darkly comic war drama with magical realist elements, the film follows Oskar, a precocious child living in Danzig, who wields seemingly preternatural abilities. He lives in contempt of the adults around him and witnesses firsthand their potential for cruelty, first via the rise of the Nazi Party and then the subsequent war. The title refers to Oskar's toy drum, which he loudly plays whenever he is displeased or upset. The German-language film was a co-production of West German, French, and Yugoslavian companies.

The film won the Palme d'Or at the 1979 Cannes Film Festival and was a major financial hit in West Germany, where it won the German Film Award for Best Fiction Film. It was received more controversially internationally, targeted by censorship campaigns in Ireland, Canada, and the United States. Despite the notoriety, the film won Best Foreign Language Film at the 1980 Academy Awards. In 2003, The New York Times placed the film on its Best 1000 Movies Ever list.

Plot 
The film centres on Oskar Matzerath, a boy born and raised in the Free City of Danzig prior to and during World War II, who recalls the story's events as an unreliable narrator. Oskar is the son of a half-Polish Kashubian woman, Agnes Bronski, who is married to a German chef named Alfred Matzerath but secretly carrying on an affair with Jan, a Polish Post Office worker and her cousin. The two men are great friends, but Alfred is blissfully unaware of his wife's infidelity. Oskar's parentage is uncertain; though he himself believes he is Jan's son.

Flashbacks reveal his mother's conception by his grandfather Joseph Kolaizcek, a petty criminal in rural Kashubia (located in modern-day Poland). He hides underneath the skirts of a young woman named Anna Bronski. He has sex with her and she tries to hide her emotions, as the troops pass close by. She later gives birth to their daughter, who is Oskar's mother. Joseph evades the authorities for a year, but when they find him again, he either drowns or escapes to America and becomes a millionaire.

In 1927, on Oskar's third birthday, he is given a tin drum. Reflecting on the foolish antics of his drunken parents and friends, he resolves to stop growing and throws himself down the cellar stairs. From that day on, he does not grow at all. Oskar discovers that he can shatter glass with his voice, an ability he often uses whenever he is upset. Oskar's drumming also causes the members of a Nazi rally to start dancing. During a visit to the circus, Oskar befriends Bebra, a performing dwarf who chose to stop growing at age 10.

When Alfred, Agnes, Jan and Oskar are on an outing to the beach, they see an eel-picker collecting eels from a horse's head used as bait. The sight makes Agnes vomit repeatedly. Alfred buys some of the eels and prepares them for dinner that night. When he insists that Agnes eat them, she becomes distraught and retreats to the bedroom. Jan enters and comforts her, all within earshot of Oskar who is hiding in the closet. She calmly returns to the dinner table and eats the eels. Over the next few days, she binges on fish. Anna Bronski helps reveal that Agnes is worried her pregnancy is due to her relations with Jan. In anger, Agnes vows that the child will never be born. She dies shortly thereafter, seemingly from the accumulated stress.

At the funeral, Oskar encounters Sigismund Markus, the kindly Jewish toy seller who supplies him with replacement drums, and who was also in love with Agnes. Markus is ordered by two of the mourners to leave because he is Jewish; Nazism is on the rise, and the Jewish and Polish residents of Danzig are under increasing pressure. Markus later commits suicide after his shop is vandalized and a synagogue is burned down by SA men.

On 1 September 1939, Oskar and Jan go looking for Kobyella, who can repair his drum. Jan slips into the Polish Post Office, despite a Nazi cordon, and participates in an armed standoff against the Nazis. During the ensuing battle, Kobyella is fatally shot and Jan is wounded. They play Skat until Kobyella dies and the Germans capture the building. Oskar is taken home, while Jan is arrested and later executed.

Alfred hires sixteen-year-old Maria to work in his shop. Oskar seduces Maria, but later discovers Alfred having sex with her. Oskar bursts into the room, makes Alfred ejaculate inside her (when he was expected to pull out, to avoid getting her pregnant), causing Maria to become angry at Alfred when he blames Oskar for the inadvertent insemination.

While rinsing her vagina in an attempt to remove the deposited semen, she and Oskar fight, and he hits her in the groin. She later gives birth to a son, who Oskar is convinced is his. Oskar also has a brief sexual relationship with Lina Greff, the wife of the local grocer and scoutmaster. It is implied that Lina was sexually frustrated as her husband preferred to spend more time with the Hitler Youth boys. Lina's husband later commits suicide (or is executed) after an official from the Nazi regime catches him 'playing' with those boys.

During World War II, Oskar meets Bebra and Roswitha, another dwarf performer in Bebra's successful troupe. Oskar decides to join them, using his glass-shattering voice as part of the act. Oskar and Roswitha have an affair, but she is killed by artillery fire during the Allied invasion of Normandy while on tour.

Oskar returns home. Much of the city has been destroyed and the Russians are fast approaching. Oskar gives Maria's three-year-old son Kurt a tin drum like his own. The Russians break into the cellar where the family is hiding. Some of them gang-rape Lina. Alfred is killed by a soldier after swallowing and choking violently on his Nazi party pin. Later Matzerath's shop goes to Mariusz Fajngold, a Jewish survivor of Treblinka who also takes care of Alfred's funeral.

During Alfred's burial, Oskar decides to grow up, and throws his drum into the grave. As he does, Kurt throws a stone at his head and he falls into the grave. Afterward, an attendee announces Oskar is growing again. The family, apart from Anna Bronski, leave for the West.

Cast

Production 

The film was mostly shot in West Germany including at the Spandau Studios, with some street scenes, particularly ones concerning the landmarks of Danzig, shot on-location in Gdańsk, Poland. The Polish communist authorities gave the crew little time in the country, since the novel itself had been banned in Eastern Bloc countries. While filming in Poland, a production assistant was arrested by the authorities when trying to buy eels from fishing boats for the beach scene, accused of attempting to sabotage the national industries. The scenes with the Polish Post Office were shot in Zagreb, Croatia as were several generic street scenes. The scenes in France were shot on-set.

Schlöndorff was authorised by Grass himself during much of the preproduction and the writing of the script. David Bennent was chosen as the role of Oskar when Schlöndorff was discussing with a doctor the possibility of a child whose growth stops at an early age, and the doctor brought up the case of the son of the actor Heinz Bennent, whom Schlöndorff was friends with. During the filming several difficulties arose: there was a supposed love affair between Daniel Olbrychski and Angela Winkler, and a romantic rivalry between Fritz Hakl, who played Bebra, and the fiancé of Mariella Oliveri, who played Roswitha.

Reception 

The Tin Drum was one of the most financially successful German films of the 1970s, taking 25 million marks at the German box office. New World Pictures paid $400,000 for the U.S. rights and the film became the highest-grossing German film in the United States, with a gross of $4 million, beating the record set the year earlier by  Rainer Werner Fassbinder's The Marriage of Maria Braun.

The film presently holds a score of 84% on Rotten Tomatoes, based on 25 reviews, with an average grade of 7.5/10.

Roger Ebert of the Chicago Sun-Times awarded the film two stars (out of four), writing "I must confess that the symbolism of the drum failed to involve me":

Vincent Canby of The New York Times called it "a seriously responsible adaptation of a gargantuan novel, but it's an adaptation that has no real life of its own. There are a number of things seen or said on the screen that, I suspect, will not make much sense to anyone who isn't familiar with the novel ... However, because the story it tells is so outsized, bizarre, funny and eccentric, the movie compels attention."

Gene Siskel of the Chicago Tribune gave the film a full four out of four stars and called it "quite shattering" with "one striking image after another."

Charles Champlin of the Los Angeles Times declared that it was "like few films since 'Citizen Kane'—a combination of stunning logistics and technique and of humanistic content that is terrifically affecting."

Gary Arnold of The Washington Post wrote that it "will be hard to beat as the season's most prestigious bad idea for a movie," stating that Oskar "doesn't have a personality forceful enough to unify the rambling continuity or replace the narrative voice and complex of meanings that gave the book intellectual vitality and authority."

In 2003, The New York Times placed the film on its Best 1000 Movies Ever list.

Accolades 

At the 1979 Cannes Film Festival, it was jointly awarded the Palme d'Or, along with Apocalypse Now. The Tin Drum was the first film directed by a German to win the Palme d'Or. In 1980, it became the first film from Germany or in German to win the Academy Award for Best Foreign Language Film.

Censorship 

The film features scenes in which Bennent, then 11 years of age and playing a stunted 16-year-old, licks effervescing sherbet powder from the navel of a 16-year-old girl, played by Katharina Thalbach. Thalbach was 24 years old at the time. Subsequently, Bennent appears to have oral sex and then intercourse with her.

In 1980, the film version of The Tin Drum was first cut, and then banned as child pornography by the Ontario Censor Board in Canada. Similarly, on June 25, 1997, following a ruling made by State District Court Judge Richard Freeman, who had reportedly only viewed a single isolated scene of the film, The Tin Drum was banned from Oklahoma County, Oklahoma, citing the state's obscenity laws for portraying underage sexuality. All copies in Oklahoma City were confiscated, and at least one person who had rented the film on video tape was threatened with prosecution. Michael Camfield, at the time a member of the Oklahoma chapter of the American Civil Liberties Union, filed a lawsuit against the police department on July 4, 1997, alleging that the tape had been illegally confiscated and his rights infringed.

This led to a high-profile series of hearings on the film's merits as a whole versus the controversial scenes, and the role of the judge as censor. The film emerged vindicated and most copies were returned within a few months. By 2001, all the cases had been settled and the film is legally available in Oklahoma County. This incident was covered in the documentary film Banned in Oklahoma, which is included in the 2004 Criterion Collection DVD release of The Tin Drum.

See also 

 List of submissions to the 52nd Academy Awards for Best Foreign Language Film
 List of German submissions for the Academy Award for Best Foreign Language Film

References

External links 

 
 
 
 
 The Tin Drum: Bang the Drum Loudly an essay by Geoffrey Macnab at the Criterion Collection
 Librarian discussion of the Oklahoma case

1979 films
1970s war drama films
West German films
German war drama films
Yugoslav war drama films
French war drama films
Polish war drama films
1970s German-language films
Hebrew-language films
1970s Italian-language films
Polish-language films
1970s Russian-language films
Political drama films
Films about percussion and percussionists
Films based on German novels
Films directed by Volker Schlöndorff
Films produced by Anatole Dauman
Films scored by Maurice Jarre
Films with screenplays by Jean-Claude Carrière
Jadran Film films
Best Foreign Language Film Academy Award winners
Palme d'Or winners
Films set in the 1890s
Films set in the 1900s
Films set in the 1910s
Films set in the 1920s
Films set in the 1930s
Films set in the 1940s
Films set in Gdańsk
Films set in Germany
Films shot in Berlin
Films shot in Croatia
Films shot in France
Films shot in Germany
Films shot in Paris
Films shot in Poland
Films shot in Yugoslavia
Films shot at Spandau Studios
Danzig Trilogy
Obscenity controversies in film
Film controversies in France
Film controversies in Germany
Film censorship in Canada
Film controversies in Canada
Film controversies in Yugoslavia
Magic realism films
Works subject to a lawsuit
1979 drama films
French World War II films
German World War II films
Yugoslav World War II films
Polish World War II films
Günter Grass
1970s French films
1970s German films